Halli may refer to:

 Halli Airport, a military airport located in Kuorevesi, Jämsä, Finland
 , a village in Finland
 Halli (899), a Finnish oil spill response vessel
 Helsinki Halli, an arena in Finland
 Haraldur Ingi Þorleifsson "Halli", an Icelandic entrepreneur, businessman and philanthropist

See also 
 Hallı (disambiguation)
 Hallie (disambiguation)
 Hally